Events in the year 2022 in Mauritius.

Incumbents 

 President: Prithvirajsing Roopun
 Prime Minister: Pravind Jugnauth

Events 
Ongoing — COVID-19 pandemic in Mauritius

 14 February – The flag of Mauritius is raised on the British-controlled Chagos Archipelago in the Indian Ocean for the first time in history. Mauritian Prime Minister Pravind Jugnauth describes the event as a "historic moment", saying that it was time for the United Kingdom to cede control of the archipelago.

Sports 

 28 July – 8 August: Mauritius at the 2022 Commonwealth Games
 7 – 17 July: Mauritius at the 2022 World Games

Deaths

January

 18 January – Guillaume Domingue, 36, radio broadcaster (born 1985)

March

 12 March – Karl Offmann, 81, Mauritian politician, president (2002–2003) (born 1940)

References 

 
2020s in Mauritius
Years of the 21st century in Mauritius
Mauritius
Mauritius